Trefor Goronwy is a vocalist, bass guitarist, guitarist, and percussionist. He joined This Heat for their final European tour in 1982, and continued to work with drummer Charles Hayward and soundman Stephen Rickard in the group Camberwell Now. He has also worked as a sound technician with groups such as Pere Ubu, Towering Inferno, David Thomas and Two Pale Boys, Spearmint, Momus and the Tuvan throat-singing ensemble Huun-Huur-Tu, whose first album he recorded in London. After several years spent in Russia, he has recently been working on recordings featuring Tuvan and Kazakh traditional instruments, particularly the igil and kobyz.

References

http://www.myspace.com/treforgoronwy

External links

Year of birth missing (living people)
Living people
English male singers
English rock bass guitarists
Male bass guitarists
English rock guitarists
English male guitarists
British percussionists
Camberwell Now members